The 2022 LA Giltinis season was the 2nd in the clubs history since their entry to the Major League Rugby in 2020. Stephen Hoiles was the coach of the club for his first full year. Dave Dennis was the captain the club for the second consecutive year. The team finished the season second in the Western Conference standings, but was later disqualified from competing in the 2022 Major League Rugby playoffs, due to violating league rules.

The Giltinis played their home matchups at Los Angeles Memorial Coliseum in Los Angeles, California.

Schedule

Standings

References

LA Giltinis seasons
LA
2022 in sports in California